Downstate may refer to:

 Downstate Illinois, the portion of the U.S. state of Illinois south of the Chicago metropolitan area
 Downstate New York, the southeastern portion of the U.S. state of New York, including New York City
 SUNY Downstate Medical Center, sometimes referred to as "Downstate"

See also
 Upstate (disambiguation)

Geography terminology
Geography of the United States